Neil Stephen Curnow (born 29 April 1982) is an English cricketer.  George is a left-handed batsman who bowls right-arm medium pace.  He was born at Truro, Cornwall.

Curnow made his Minor Counties Championship debut for Cornwall in 2000 against Dorset.  From 2000 to 2007, he represented the county in 17 Minor Counties Championship matches, the last of which came against Shropshire.  George also represented Cornwall in the MCCA Knockout Trophy.  His debut in that competition came against Wiltshire in 2000.  From 2000 to 2006, he represented the county in 11 Trophy matches, the last of which came against Berkshire.

Curnow also represented Cornwall in 2 List A matches.  These came against Cheshire and Sussex in the 2001 Cheltenham & Gloucester Trophy and Worcestershire in the 2002 Cheltenham & Gloucester Trophy.  In his 2 List A matches, he scored 37 runs at a batting average of 12.33, with a high score of 25.  In the field he took a single catch.

He currently plays club cricket for St Just Cricket Club in the Cornwall Cricket League.

References

External links

Neil Curnow at Cricinfo
Neil Curnow at CricketArchive

1982 births
Living people
Sportspeople from Truro
English cricketers
Cornwall cricketers